Săcuieu is a commune in Cluj County, Transylvania, Romania. It is composed of three villages: Rogojel (Havasrogoz), Săcuieu, and Vișagu (Viság). The river Săcuieu passes through the commune.

Demographics 
According to the census from 2011 there was a total population of 1,441 people living in this commune. Of this population, 86.81% are ethnic Romanians, 13.04% ethnic Romani.

Natives
George Potra (1907–1990), teacher and historian

References

Atlasul localităților județului Cluj (Cluj County Localities Atlas), Suncart Publishing House, Cluj-Napoca, 

Communes in Cluj County
Localities in Transylvania